Sinan-paša Sijerčić (died 1806) was an Ottoman Pasha (general) from the Bosnia Eyalet, who governed the area of Goražde and its surroundings, and also Pljevlja as mütesellim. He died while commanding the Ottoman Army in the Battle of Mišar against Serbian revolutionaries in mid-August 1806, being slain by Luka Lazarević. He descended from a Bosnian Serb family, the Šijernić. He helped reconstruct the Serbian Orthodox Herzog's Church in Goražde, where his grandfather Radoslav had been buried.

References

19th-century people from the Ottoman Empire
Bosnian Muslims from the Ottoman Empire
Ottoman military personnel of the Serbian Revolution
Pashas
People of the First Serbian Uprising
People from the Ottoman Empire of Bosnian descent
Ottoman military personnel killed in action
People from Goražde
1806 deaths
S